816 Juliana is a minor planet orbiting the Sun. It measures 59.85k in diameter. It was discovered on 8 February 1916 by Max Wolf at the Landessternwarte Heidelberg-Königstuhl Observatory in Heidelberg, Germany.

Wolf probably chose the name to honour Princess Juliana (later Queen Juliana of the Netherlands); he had previously named 392 Wilhelmina after her mother.

References

External links
 
 

000816
Discoveries by Max Wolf
Named minor planets
19160208